Ilişua may refer to several places in Romania:

 , a village in Uriu Commune, Bistrița-Năsăud County
 , a village in Sărmășag Commune, Sălaj County
 Ilișua (river), a tributary of the Someșul Mare in Bistrița-Năsăud County